Bely Anuy (Ĵalañay) is a rural locality (a selo) and the administrative centre of Beloanuyskoye Rural Settlement, Ust-Kansky District, the Altai Republic, Russia. The population was 736 as of 2016. There are 7 streets.

Geography 
Bely Anuy is located 50 km north of Ust-Kan (the district's administrative centre) by road. Turata and Verkhny Beloanuy are the nearest rural localities.

References 

Rural localities in Ust-Kansky District